Omero Losi (February 23, 1925 in Moglia – 25 November 2012 in Carpi) was an Italian professional football player.

He played for 3 seasons (79 games, 15 goals) in the Serie A for A.S. Roma.

References

1925 births
2012 deaths
Italian footballers
Serie A players
A.C. Reggiana 1919 players
A.S. Roma players
Modena F.C. players
Sportspeople from the Province of Mantua
Association football forwards
Footballers from Lombardy